Arborbrook Christian Academy is a private Christian school in the Waxhaw, North Carolina area. Classes run Monday–Thursday for Kindergarten through 12th grade.

External links
School website

Christian schools in North Carolina
Schools in Union County, North Carolina